The 1895–96 Washington Huskies men's basketball team represents the University of Washington during the 1895–96 college men's basketball season.

Schedule

|-

References

Washington Huskies men's basketball seasons
Washington
Washington Husk
Washington Husk